Mohamed Abdel Sami (born 1936) is an Egyptian rower. He competed in the 1960 Summer Olympics.

References

1936 births
Living people
Rowers at the 1960 Summer Olympics
Egyptian male rowers
Olympic rowers of Egypt